Wayne Mulherin (born 17 June 1957) is an Australian cricketer. He played one first-class match for New South Wales in 1983/84.

See also
 List of New South Wales representative cricketers

References

External links
 

1957 births
Living people
Australian cricketers
New South Wales cricketers
Cricketers from Sydney